Danger is a CBS television dramatic anthology series that began on September 26, 1950, and ended on May 31, 1955. Its original title was Amm-i-dent Playhouse.

The show featured many actors including Leslie Nielsen, E.G. Marshall, Joseph Anthony, Edward Binns, John Cassavetes, Míriam Colón, Ben Gazzara, Grace Kelly, Richard Kiley, Walter Slezak, Hildy Parks, James Gregory, Paul Langton, Cloris Leachman, Jayne Meadows, Martin Ritt, Maria Riva, Lee Grant, Kim Stanley, Rod Steiger, Steve Allen, Anne Bancroft, Jacqueline Susann, Walter Matthau, and Leo Penn.

Production
Yul Brynner was one of the directors of Danger. Tony Mottola composed the show's theme and background music for episodes. Richard Stark was the announcer.

Amm-i-dent sponsored the program, which was originally titled Amm-i-dent Playhouse. The title was changed effective with the September 26, 1950, episode.

Episodes

References

External links

Danger at CVTA with episode list

1950 American television series debuts
1955 American television series endings
1950s American anthology television series
1950s American drama television series
Black-and-white American television shows
CBS original programming
English-language television shows